Alessandro Bianchi may refer to:

 Alessandro Bianchi (banker, born 1985), Italian banker
 Alessandro Bianchi (footballer, born 1966), Italian international footballer
 Alessandro Bianchi (footballer, born 1989), San Marino international footballer
 Alessandro Bianchi (politician, born 1945), Italian politician, professor and urban planner
 Alessandro Bianchi (politician, born 1965), Italian politician